Aviron Bayonnais Football Club (commonly referred to as simply Bayonne) is a French association football club based in Bayonne. The club is a part of a sports club that was formed in 1904 that is also known for its rugby union club.

History 

The football club was founded in 1935 and currently play in the Championnat National 3, the fifth level of French football. Bayonne plays its home matches at the Stade Didier Deschamps located in the city. It is named after Bayonne native, former youth player and the 1998 FIFA World Cup and UEFA Euro 2000 winning captain Didier Deschamps, who also played for Marseille and Juventus. Central defender Aymeric Laporte is another player who featured for Bayonne as a youth before starring for Athletic Bilbao and later Manchester City. Athletic have had a collaboration agreement with Bayonne for several years that they recently renewed until 2024. While Aviron is the largest club in the French Basque Country, it has not replicated the successes of the clubs on the Spanish side of the border.

References 

Sport in Bayonne
1935 establishments in France
Association football clubs established in 1935
Organizations based in Northern Basque Country
Football clubs in Nouvelle-Aquitaine